Montegordo is a mountain forming part of the eastern end of the Iberian System, Valencian Community, Spain. The Barranc de la Valltorta gorge is located close by.

La Coveta is a cave  on the side of the mountain with prehistoric cave paintings.

See also
 Mountains of the Valencian Community
 Serra d'En Celler, a mountain range nearby

References

External links
Albocàsser-Montegordo 15 - Wikiloc
Museo de la Valltorta
Alt Maestrat
Mountains of the Valencian Community
Gordo